These are the statistics for the 2016 AFF Championship.

Goalscorers
6 goals

 Teerasil Dangda

3 goals

 Boaz Solossa
 Sarawut Masuk
 Siroch Chatthong

2 goals

 Chan Vathanaka
 Hansamu Yama
 Stefano Lilipaly
 Mohd Amri Yahyah
 Aung Thu
 Zaw Min Tun
 Lê Công Vinh
 Nguyễn Văn Quyết

1 goal

 Chrerng Polroth
 Sos Suhana
 Andik Vermansyah
 Fachrudin Aryanto
 Lerby Eliandry
 Manahati Lestusen
 Rizky Pora
 Syazwan Zainon
 David Htan
 Misagh Bahadoran
 Phil Younghusband
 Khairul Amri
 Chanathip Songkrasin
 Peerapat Notchaiya
 Theerathon Bunmathan
 Nguyễn Trọng Hoàng
 Vũ Minh Tuấn
 Vũ Văn Thanh

1 own goal

  Nub Tola (playing against Vietnam)

Assists
4 assists
 Rizky Pora

3 assists
 Theerathon Bunmathan

2 assist

 Boaz Solossa
 Nanda Kyaw
 Sarach Yooyen
 Nguyễn Trọng Hoàng

1 assist

 Chan Vathanaka
 Keo Sokpheng
 Sok Sovan
 Benny Wahyudi
 Stefano Lilipaly
 Ahmad Hazwan Bakri
 Baddrol Bakhtiar
 Safee Sali
 Than Paing
 Stephan Schröck
 Safuwan Baharudin
 Charyl Chappuis
 Prakit Deeprom
 Sarawut Masuk
 Đinh Thanh Trung
 Nguyễn Văn Toàn

Discipline

Yellow cards
2 yellow cards

 Benny Wahyudi
 Fachrudin Aryanto
 Kurnia Meiga
 Rudolof Basna
 Baddrol Bakhtiar
 David Htan
 Quế Ngọc Hải

1 yellow card

 Chhin Chhoeun
 Nub Tola
 Rous Samoeun
 Soeuy Visal
 Sos Suhana
 Abduh Lestaluhu
 Boaz Solossa
 Evan Dimas
 Hansamu Yama Pranata
 Stefano Lilipaly
 Hazwan Bakri
 Mohd Amri Yahyah
 Rizal Ghazali
 Shahrom Kalam
 Shahrul Saad
 Zaquan Adha
 Aung Thu
 Hlaing Bo Bo
 Kyaw Zin Lwin
 Nanda Kyaw
 Yan Aung Kyaw
 Ye Ko Oo
 Manuel Ott
 Mark Hartmann
 Mike Ott
 OJ Porteria
 Stephan Schröck
 Anumanthan Kumar
 Daniel Bennett
 Faritz Hameed
 Hassan Sunny
 Khairul Amri
 Safuwan Baharudin
 Shakir Hamzah
 Adison Promrak
 Kroekrit Thaweekarn
 Prakit Deeprom
 Sarach Yooyen
 Ngô Hoàng Thịnh
 Nguyễn Trọng Hoàng
 Vũ Minh Tuấn

Red cards
1 red card

 Abduh Lestaluhu
 Hafiz Abu Sujad
 Trần Nguyên Mạnh
 Trương Đình Luật

By team

By referee

Penalty shoot-outs

Awards

Man of the Match

Clean sheets

Overall results

External links
 (Official website)

Statistics